Dobbin is an unincorporated community on the North Branch Potomac River in Grant County, West Virginia, United States. Dobbin is located southwest of Bayard on West Virginia Route 90.

References

Unincorporated communities in Grant County, West Virginia
Unincorporated communities in West Virginia